"Kaleidoscope in "K"" is a novella by author A. J. Cronin, initially published in 1933 in Cosmopolitan magazine. All of the action unfolds within twelve hours in a London hospital, and the story centres around the conflict between a young surgeon, Dr. Barclay, and the hospital chief, Dr. Selby. A subplot is the rivalry between Barclay and a playboy physician, Dr. Preston, as they vie for the attentions of Miss Fanshawe, an attractive nurse. The story comes to a tense climax as Barclay prepares for a delicate brain operation, a revolutionary procedure to which Selby is opposed. The story was also printed in book form by various publishers, and it was also adapted into a 1934 film, Once to Every Woman.

1933 short stories
British short stories
British novellas
Short stories by A. J. Cronin
Works originally published in Cosmopolitan (magazine)
British novels adapted into films